The Clackamas River is an approximately  tributary of the Willamette River in northwestern Oregon, in the United States.
The Clackamas flows briefly north and then flows northwest through the mountains, passing through North Fork Reservoir and Estacada. It then emerges from the mountains southeast of Portland. It joins the Willamette near Oregon City and forms the boundary between Oregon City and Gladstone.

The Clackamas provides hydroelectric power and drinking water for some of the Portland metropolitan area, and it supports runs of Coho salmon, spring and fall Chinook salmon, and summer and winter steelhead. The river's old-growth forests, its habitat for several species of birds, its healthy fish runs, and the recreational opportunities that it provides—such as fishing and whitewater rafting—led to the designation of more than half of the length of the river into the National Wild and Scenic Rivers System (NWSRS). This environment also allowed Native Americans to settle in the river's basin as early as 10,000 years ago.

Regulation of the river began in 1905 with the Cazadero Dam. In 1912, the River Mill Dam intercepted wood and coarse sediment. Later dams at North Fork, Oak Grove, Stone Creek, and Timothy Lake also intercepted wood sediment on the lower river.

Course
The Clackamas River arises on the western slopes of the Cascade Range near Olallie Butte, between Mount Hood and Mount Jefferson in the Mount Hood National Forest.

Over its next , much of which is in a relatively level stretch known as Big Bottom, the river receives Cub Creek from the left, Sisi Creek from the right, then Hunter, Fawn, Rhododendron, and Lowe creeks, all from the left, followed by Wall, Pinhead, and Campbell creeks, all from the right, Kansas Creek from the left, and Cabin Creek and Lost Creek, both from the right. About  from the mouth, Granite Creek enters from the left, and the river flows by Austin Hot Springs and Picnic Area. At the confluence, Two Rivers Picnic Area is on the left and Riverford Campground is on the right. About  further downstream, Trout Creek enters from the left, and Riverside Campground is on the right.

From its confluence with Oak Grove Fork, the river runs close to Oregon Route 224 for most of the rest of its course. The highway is initially north and east of the river; that is, to its right. Over the next few miles, the river receives Big Creek, Sandstone Creek, and Whale Creek, all from the left, passes under Route 224, receives Cripple Creek, and passes under Route 224 again at the unincorporated community of Three Lynx. Near this point, Roaring River Campground is on the right.

Over the next few miles, the river flows by Fish Creek Campground and Armstrong Campground, where it passes under Route 224. The river then passes Lockaby Campground and Carter Bridge Campground, where it passes under Route 224 again for the fourth and final time. From here to near Gladstone, the river flows south and west of the highway, which is on its right. Around  from the mouth, the river receives the South Fork Clackamas River from the left opposite a landform known as Big Cliff. About  later, the river enters North Fork Reservoir and soon receives the North Fork Clackamas River from the right. Shortly thereafter, the Clackamas receives Lingleback Creek from the right, passes under Oregon Route 211 at Estacada, receives Dubois Creek from the left, and reaches River Mill Dam.

Deep Creek then enters from the right, Foster Creek from the left, and Richardson Creek from the right before the Clackamas River reaches Carver  from the mouth. Here it receives Clear Creek from the left. Thereafter, Rock Creek enters from the right and Johnson Creek from the left before the river passes under Interstate 205 and then Oregon Route 99E (McLoughlin Boulevard) between Oregon City to the south and Gladstone to the north.

History

Early inhabitants

Before 1800, coniferous forests covered most of the watershed, and its streams supported big populations of salmon, steelhead, and other fish. Native Americans hunted, fished and gathered food and materials in the Clackamas River drainage as early as 10,000 years ago. By 2,000 to 3,000 years ago, they had established permanent settlements along the river's lower floodplain. This was home to the Clackamas tribe, a subgroup of the Chinookan speakers who lived in the Columbia River valley from Celilo Falls to the Pacific Ocean. The Clackamas lands, reaching into the Cascade Range foothills, included the lower Willamette River from Willamette Falls at what became Oregon City to the confluence with the Columbia.

When Lewis and Clark visited the area in 1806, the Clackamas tribe consisted of about 1,800 people living in 11 villages. Big villages lay near the falls and the mouth of the Clackamas River; others lay near Estacada and Eagle Creek. In the winter, families stayed in the villages, but at other times they used an extensive system of trails to visit seasonal camps. Epidemics of smallpox, malaria, and measles reduced the Clackamas population to 88 by 1851, and in 1855 the tribe surrendered its lands. Remnants of the tribe continued to travel from the Warm Springs Indian Reservation to fish and to gather berries near Estacada through the 1930s.

Watershed
Most of the upper half of the basin lies within the rugged Mount Hood National Forest, managed by the U.S. Forest Service, while most of the lower watershed, partly agricultural and more heavily populated, is privately owned. Private timber companies own some of the land between the national forest and the lower watershed, and some of it is public land managed by the Bureau of Land Management. Roughly 72 percent of the watershed is on public land; 25 percent is private, and 3 percent is owned by Native American tribes. The watershed's estimated population in 1995 was 63,702.

The Clackamas River supplies drinking water to more than 200,000 people. The City of Estacada, Clackamas River Water, the combined Oak Lodge Water District and Sunrise Water Authority, the South Fork Water Board, and the City of Lake Oswego all draw water from the Clackamas.

The Clackamas River Basin Council, with diverse representatives from over 20 stakeholder groups, fosters partnerships with organizations and private individuals to advocate natural resource conservation and preserve the watershed for future generations. Stakeholders include (but are not limited to) those involved in agriculture, education, fish and wildlife, hydropower, recreation, timber production, and government agencies.

The watershed is home to the last significant run of wild late-winter coho salmon in the Columbia Basin, which generally spawn on the main stem of the Clackamas above the North Fork Reservoir. The watershed also has one of only two remaining runs of spring chinook in the Willamette basin and supports a significant population of winter steelhead, cutthroat trout, and native lamprey.

Wild and Scenic designation
Forty-seven miles (76 km) of the Clackamas River, from Big Springs to Big Cliff, are federally protected as part of the NWSRS. The protected portion of the Clackamas features five categories of resources that are considered to be "outstandingly remarkable", defined by the NWSRS as having "importance to the region or nation".

The five are opportunities for recreation such as white water rafting near the Portland metropolitan area; anadromous fish habitat supporting wild late winter coho, spring chinook, and winter steelhead; habitat for the federally threatened bald eagle and northern spotted owl; potential habitat for the threatened peregrine falcon; the forests of old-growth Douglas-fir along its banks; and historic importance. All  of a tributary, the Roaring River, are designated as Wild and Scenic and are within the Roaring River Wilderness. Another  of the South Fork Clackamas River were designated as Wild and Scenic along with the creation of the Clackamas Wilderness in 2009.

Pollution
In March 2008, the United States Geological Survey (USGS) released a report entitled "Pesticide Occurrence and Distribution in the Lower Clackamas River Basin, Oregon, 2000–2005."  It details pesticide pollution in the lower Clackamas River, its tributaries, and in pre- and post-treatment drinking water.

In all, 63 pesticide compounds: 33 herbicides, 15 insecticides, 6 fungicides, and 9 pesticide degradates were detected in samples collected during storm and nonstorm conditions.   Fifty-seven pesticides or degradates were detected in the tributaries (mostly during storms), whereas fewer compounds (26) were detected in samples of source water from the lower mainstem Clackamas River, with fewest (15) occurring in drinking water.

The study concluded, "Given their frequent and widespread occurrence, especially during storms, pesticides have the potential to affect aquatic life and the quality of drinking water derived from the lower river," and laid out areas for further study.

See also
 Clackamas (disambiguation)
 List of rivers of Oregon
 List of longest streams of Oregon
 List of National Wild and Scenic Rivers

References

External links

 Clackamas River Basin Council
 Student Watershed Research Project (SWRP): Clackamas River watershed map
 "Tests find some pesticides in lower Clackamas River" by Scott Learn, The Oregonian, March 17, 2008
 National Wild and Scenic Rivers System

Wild and Scenic Rivers of the United States
Tributaries of the Willamette River
Rivers of Marion County, Oregon
Rivers of Clackamas County, Oregon
Rivers of Oregon
Oregon placenames of Native American origin